The Coke baronetcy of Longford, in the County of Derby was created in the Baronetage of England on 30 December 1641 for Edward Coke.

He was the grandson of Sir Edward Coke, Lord Chief Justice. His father Clement, youngest son of Sir Edward, acquired by marriage the Longford Hall estate in Derbyshire. Coke served as high sheriff of Derbyshire in 1646. His son the second Baronet was Member of Parliament for Derbyshire in 1685.

The baronetcy was extinct on the death of the third Baronet in 1727. The Longford estate passed into the ownership of the senior branch of the Coke family of Holkham Hall, Norfolk, represented by the Earl of Leicester.

Coke of Longford (1641)
 
 Sir Edward Coke, 1st Baronet (died 1669)
 Sir Robert Coke, 2nd Baronet (1645–1688)
 Sir Edward Coke, 3rd Baronet (1648–1727)

References

 A Genealogical and Heraldic History of the Extinct and Dormant Baronetcies of England Ireland and Scotland Burke and Burke (1844) p 123 Google Books
 

Extinct baronetcies in the Baronetage of England
1641 establishments in England